Enrique Soladrero Arbide (30 April 1913 – 17 October 1976) was a Spanish footballer and manager. He played club football for Real Betis, Real Oviedo and Real Zaragoza in the 1930s and 1940s, and played international football for Spain.

References

External links
 
 
 

1913 births
1976 deaths
People from Arrigorriaga
Sportspeople from Biscay
Spanish footballers
Footballers from the Basque Country (autonomous community)
Association football midfielders
La Liga players
Segunda División players
Tercera División players
Real Betis players
Real Oviedo players
Real Zaragoza players
Spain international footballers
Segunda División managers
Tercera División managers
Real Zaragoza managers
CD Numancia managers
Spanish football managers